Richard Kyle may refer to:

 Richard H. Kyle (1937–2021), American judge in Minnesota
 Richard G. Kyle, American academic, theologian and author
 Richard G. Kyle (businessman), CEO of Timken Company
 Richard Kyle (politician), member of the Arizona House of Representatives